This is a list of people and organisations named in the Paradise Papers as connected to offshore companies. The International Consortium of Investigative Journalists stated in their politicians database, as a disclaimer, "There are legitimate uses for offshore companies and trusts. We do not intend to suggest or imply that any people, companies or other entities included in the ICIJ Offshore Leaks Database have broken the law or otherwise acted improperly."

Government officials
Current or former heads of state or government of their country as defined by their political position at the time of announcement, not whether the documents in the Papers relating to them coincided with their period of office.

Heads of state
Former heads of state

  Elizabeth II, former Queen of the United Kingdom and the other Commonwealth realms
  José María Figueres, former President of Costa Rica
  Juan Manuel Santos, former President of Colombia
  Ellen Johnson Sirleaf, former President of Liberia
  Petro Poroshenko, former President of Ukraine

Heads of government

Former heads of government
  Shaukat Aziz, former Prime Minister of Pakistan
  Jean Chrétien, former Prime Minister of Canada
  Alfred Gusenbauer, former Chancellor of Austria
 Yukio Hatoyama, former Prime Minister of Japan
  Paul Martin, former Prime Minister of Canada
  Brian Mulroney, former Prime Minister of Canada
  Gerhard Schröder, former Chancellor of Germany
  Hamad bin Jassim bin Jaber Al Thani, former Prime Minister of Qatar

Cabinet officials

Argentina
  Juan José Aranguren, Minister of Energy
  Luis Caputo, Minister of Finance

Brazil
  Blairo Maggi, Minister of Agriculture
  Henrique Meirelles, Minister of Finance

India
  Ashok Gehlot, former Chief Minister of Rajasthan
  Sachin Pilot, former Minister of Corporate Affairs
  Y. S. Jaganmohan Reddy, Opposition Leader, Andhra Pradesh 

Kazakhstan
  Mukhtar Ablyazov, former Minister of Energy and Trade
  Sauat Mynbayev, Minister of Oil and Gas

Kenya
  Sally Kosgei, former Minister of Agriculture

Lebanon
  Adnan Kassar, former Minister of State and Minister of Economy and Trade

Mexico
  Pedro Aspe, former Secretary of Finance and Public Credit
  Alejandro Gertz Manero, former Secretary of Public Security

Serbia
  Nenad Popović, Minister without portfolio

United States
  Steven Mnuchin, former Secretary of the Treasury
  Penny Pritzker, former Secretary of Commerce
  Wilbur Ross, former Secretary of Commerce
  Rex Tillerson, former Secretary of State

Members of legislatures

Canada
  Leo Kolber, former member of the Senate

European Union
   Antanas Guoga, Member of the European Parliament

India
  Vijay Mallya, former member of the Rajya Sabha and son of businessman Vittal Mallya
  Jayant Sinha, member of the Lok Sabha and Minister of State for Civil Aviation
  Ravindra Kishore Sinha, member of the Rajya Sabha

Iraq
  Mudhar Shawkat, former member of the Council of Representatives

Japan
  Masamitsu Naito, member of the House of Councillors
  Taro Yamada, former member of the House of Councillors

Mexico
  Joaquín Gamboa Pascoe, former member of the Senate and Chamber of Deputies

Nigeria
  Bukola Saraki, former President of the Senate of Nigeria

Russia
  Alexey Ezubov, member of the State Duma
  Aleksandr Skorobogatko, former member of the State Duma

Spain
  Pablo Crespo, former member of Parliament of Galicia and implicated in the Gürtel case

Ukraine
  Anton Pryhodsky, former member of the Verkhovna Rada

United Kingdom
  Michael Ashcroft, former member of the House of Lords
  George Magan, member of the House of Lords
  Jacob Rees-Mogg, member of the House of Commons
  James Sassoon, member of the House of Lords and former Commercial Secretary to the Treasury

Other government officials

El Salvador
  Carlos Quintanilla Schmidt, former Vice President of El Salvador

Indonesia
 Prabowo Subianto, chairman of the Great Indonesia Movement Party
 Sandiaga Salahuddin Uno, former Deputy Governor of Jakarta

Saudi Arabia
  Khalid bin Sultan, former Deputy Minister of Defense

Spain
  Guillermo Ortega Alonso, former Mayor of Majadahonda and implicated in Gürtel case
  Xavier Trias, former Mayor of Barcelona

United States
  Wesley Clark, former presidential candidate and Supreme Allied Commander Europe
  Gary Cohn, director of the National Economic Council
  Jon Huntsman Jr., Ambassador to Russia
  Randal Quarles, Vice Chairman for Supervision of the Federal Reserve

Relatives and associates of government officials

Canada
  Stephen Bronfman, close friend of Prime Minister Justin Trudeau

Ghana
  Ibrahim Mahama, brother of former President John Mahama

Greece
   Mareva Grabowski, wife of Prime Minister Kyriakos Mitsotakis

Indonesia
  Tommy and Mamiek Suharto, children of former President Suharto

Israel
  Jonathan Kolber, son of Canadian senator Leo Kolber; former CEO of Koor Industries; beneficiary of the Kolber Trust

Jordan
  Noor Al-Hussein, former Queen consort of Jordan

Montenegro
  Ana Kolarević, sister of former Prime Minister and President Milo Đukanović

Russia
  Olga Shuvalova, wife of First Deputy Prime Minister Igor Shuvalov

Spain
  Santiago Alarcó, ex brother-in-law of former Vice President of the Government, Rodrigo Rato
  Blanca de la Mata y Pobes, wife of former President of the Congress of Deputies, Jesús Posada
  Corinna zu Sayn-Wittgenstein, mistress of former King Juan Carlos I of Spain

Turkey
   Erkam and Bulent Yildirim, sons of Prime Minister Binali Yıldırım

United Kingdom
  Charles, Prince of Wales, heir apparent to the British throne
  Benjamin Leadsom, husband of former Leader of the House of Commons and Lord President of the Council Andrea Leadsom
  Peter de Putron, brother-in-law of Andrea Leadsom

Non-government officials and other people

Businesspeople

Multiple citizenship
 Micky Arison, chairman of Carnival Corporation & plc
 Leonard Blavatnik, founder of Access Industries
 Germán Efromovich, founder of Synergy Group
 Ivan Glasenberg, CEO of Glencore
 Jean-Claude Bastos de Morais, entrepreneur
 Marc Rich, Major shareholder in Glencore
 Lino Saputo, founder of Saputo Inc.
 Mark Scheinberg and his father Isai Scheinberg, founders of PokerStars
 George Soros, founder of Soros Fund Management and Open Society Foundations

Andorra
  Francesc Robert Ribes, former president of Ràdio i Televisió d'Andorra

Argentina
  Alan Faena, hotelier and real estate developer
  Ignacio Jorge Rosner, businessman and financier

Australia
  David Coe, founder of Allco Finance Group
  Richard Goyder, chairman of AFL Commission and former CEO of Wesfarmers
  John Kinghorn, founder of RAMS Home Loans and former shareholder of Allco Finance Group
  Nicholas Moore, CEO of Macquarie Group

Canada 
  Carl Dare, former owner of Dare Foods
  Michael DeGroote, businessman and philanthropist
  Julien Lavallée, top seller in StubHub
 Peter Nygård, accused child sex trafficker, founder of Nygard International
  Thierry Vandal, former CEO of Hydro-Québec

Croatia
  Danko Končar, majority shareholder of the Afarak Group

France
  Bernard Arnault, CEO of LVMH
 Philippe Starck, designer

Germany
  Curt Engelhorn, former owner of Roche Diagnostics and DePuy
  Paul Gauselmann, founder and CEO of Gauselmann

Greece
  Giannis Alafouzos, owner of Panathinaikos F.C.
  George Economou, shipowner
  Telis Mistakidis, major shareholder in Glencore
  Nikolas Tsakos, shipowner
  Giannis Vardinogiannis, former owner of Panathinaikos F.C.
  Vardis Vardinogiannis, chairman and controlling shareholder of Motor Oil Hellas and Vegas Oil and Gas

Iceland
  Björgólfur Thor Björgólfsson, investor and chairman of Novator Partners

India
  Vijay Mallya, chairman of United Breweries Group
  Bandi Parthasaradhi Reddy, founder of Hetero Drugs
  Niira Radia, former corporate lobbyist
  Ashok Seth, chairman of Fortis-Escorts

Israel
  Dan Gertler, founder and president of Dan Gertler International Group
  Idan Ofer, founder of Tanker Pacific and principal of Quantum Pacific Group

Kazakhstan
  Nurzhan Subkhanberdin, banker and former chairman of Kazkommertsbank
  Nina Zhussupova, member of the board of directors of Kazkommertsbank

Malaysia
  Datuk Kamaruddin Taib, chairman of HSBC Bank Malaysia

Mexico
  Alberto Baillères, chairman of Grupo BAL and ITAM
  Ricardo Salinas Pliego, founder and chairman of Grupo Salinas
  Carlos Slim, owner of Grupo Carso

Pakistan
  Alauddin Feerasta, chairman of Soneri Bank
  Sadruddin Hashwani, founder and chairman of Hashoo Group
  Mian Muhammad Mansha, chairman of Nishat Group

Russia
  Roman Abramovich, owner of Millhouse Capital and Chelsea F.C.
  Oleg Deripaska, founder and owner of Basic Element
  Leonid Mikhelson, CEO of Novatek
  Yuri Milner, US-based Russian Silicon Valley investor, and investor in a real estate start-up, Cadre, founded by Donald Trump's son-in-law and senior adviser Jared Kushner
  Aleksandr Ponomarenko, businessman and owner of "Putin's Palace"
  Arkady and Boris Romanovich Rotenberg, co-owners of SGM
  Marina Sechina, investor and ex-wife of Igor Sechin
  Oleg Tinkov, oligarch
  Alisher Usmanov, oligarch

Saudi Arabia
  Bakr bin Laden, chairman of the Saudi Binladen Group

Spain
  Francisco Correa Sánchez, businessman and head of the Gürtel case
  Daniel Maté, billionaire co-owner of Glencore
  Juan Bautista Granell Campderà, businessman
  Carmen Cervera, Baroness of Thyssen-Bornemisza, socialité and art collector, and his son Borja Thyssen-Bornemisza
  Joan Laporta, former president of FC Barcelona
  José Manuel Loureda, former president and co-founder of Sacyr
  Francisco Ortiz von Bismarck, businessman and economist, descendant of Otto von Bismarck
  Luis del Rivero, former president and co-founder of Sacyr
  Georges Santamaría, owner of Terra Mítica and Aqualandia
  Juan Villalonga, former CEO of Telefónica

Sweden
  Christer Gardell, hedge fund manager
  Bertil Hult, founder of EF Education First
  Leif Östling, former CEO of Scania AB and chairman of Confederation of Swedish Enterprise

Syria
  Rami Makhlouf, owner of Syriatel

United Kingdom
  Arron Banks, businessman, political donor and co-founder of the Leave.EU campaign
  David and Frederick Barclay, businessmen founders of Shop Direct, and David's wife (now widow), Zoe Barclay.
  Robert Edmiston, billionaire motor trade entrepreneur and founder of Christian Vision
  Hugh Grosvenor, businessman and landowner
 Hugh van Cutsem, landowner, banker, businessman, and horse-breeder
 Jim Mellon, billionaire businessman
  Michael Cyprian Waller-Bridge, founder of Tradepoint and father of actress Phoebe Waller-Bridge

United States
  Sheldon Adelson, founder of the Las Vegas Sands
  Paul Allen, co-founder of Microsoft
   Thomas J. Barrack Jr., founder of Colony NorthStar
  J. Christopher and Robert Burch, brothers
  Jeffrey Epstein, late financier and convicted sex offender
  John Augustine Hearst, business and media executive
  Carl Icahn, founder of Icahn Enterprises
  Peter Karmanos, majority owner of the Carolina Hurricanes
  Charles and David Koch, respectively CEO and EVP of Koch Industries
  Robert Kraft, founder and CEO of Kraft Group
  Robert Mercer, co-CEO of Renaissance Technologies
  Pierre Omidyar, founder of eBay
  Stephen Pagliuca, co-chairman of Bain Capital
  Geoffrey Palmer, real estate developer
  Stephen A. Schwarzman, founder of The Blackstone Group
  James Harris Simons, co-founder of Renaissance Technologies
  Paul Singer, founder of Elliott Management Corporation
  Warren Stephens, chairman, president, and CEO of Stephens Inc.
  Steve Wynn, CEO of Wynn Resorts

Zambia
  Hakainde Hichilema, businessman and politician

Entertainment personalities

Australia
  Michael Hutchence, singer
  Nicole Kidman, actress
  Keith Urban, singer

Canada
  Avril Lavigne, singer

Colombia
  Shakira, singer

France
  Jean-Jacques Annaud, film director

India
  Amitabh Bachchan, Bollywood actor
  Manyata Dutt, actress

Ireland
   Bono, singer and philanthropist

Japan
  Akira Toriyama, manga artist

Spain
  José María Cano, painter and former member of Mecano
  El Cordobés, bullfighter
  José Frade, film producer
  Julio Iglesias and his manager, Alfredo Fraile Lameyer
  Inés Sastre, model and film actress
United Kingdom
   Fiona Delany, actress in Mrs. Brown's Boys
  Martin Delany, actor in Mrs. Brown's Boys
  Patrick Houlihan, actor in Mrs. Brown's Boys
  Keira Knightley, actress
  Gary Lineker, retired footballer and current sports broadcaster
  Emma Watson, actress 

United States
  Chubby Checker, singer
  Sheryl Crow, singer
  John Denver, singer
  Duke Ellington, composer
  Kelly Clarkson, singer
  Madonna, singer
  Martha Stewart, television personality, business woman, and convicted felon
  Justin Timberlake, singer
  Harvey Weinstein, film producer and convicted sex offender

Other
Mexico
  Marcial Maciel, Catholic priest and founder of the Legion of Christ and Regnum Christi

Spain
  Fernando Alonso, and his manager, Luis García Abad

United Kingdom
  Lewis Hamilton, Formula One driver

Organisations

Companies
Argentina
  CAMMESA (Compañía Administradora del Mercado Mayorista Eléctrico)
  Macri Group

Australia
  Colonial First State
  Commonwealth Bank

Barbados
  Shell Western Supply and Trading Limited, subsidiary of Royal Dutch Shell

Bermuda
  Appleby
 Estera

Brazil
  Odebrecht
  Synergy Aerospace, subsidiary of Synergy Group

Canada
  Hydro-Québec
  Katanga Mining
  Loblaw Companies
  Maple Leaf Foods
  Montreal Canadiens
  Petro-Canada
  Suncor Energy

Democratic Republic of the Congo
  Gécamines

Finland
  Finnfund

France
  Dassault Aviation

Germany
  Allianz
  Bayer
  Deutsche Bank
  Deutsche Post
  Meininger
  Siemens
  Sixt
  Wirecard

Greece
  Intralot

India
  Apollo Tyres
  Emaar India
  Essel Group
  GMR Group
  Havells
  Hindujas
  Hiranandani Group
  Jindal Steel and Power
  Sun Group
  United Spirits
  Videocon

Isle of Man
  Conister Bank

Panama
  Avianca Holdings

Russia
  DST Global, part of Mail.Ru Group
  Gazprom
  TNK-BP
  VTB Bank

Singapore
  Asiaciti Trust

South Africa
  Illovo Sugar
  Investec
  Shanduka Group
  Standard Bank

Switzerland
  Glencore

Ukraine
  Roshen

United Kingdom
  Barclays
  Diageo
  Linklaters
  Sol Antilles y Guianas Limited, subsidiary of Royal Dutch Shell
  Somerset Capital Management

United States
  Amazon
  Apple Inc.
  Baker McKenzie
  Bank of Utah
  Disney
  Facebook
  Goldman Sachs
  McDonald's
  Nike, Inc.
  The Blackstone Group
  Twitter
  Uber
  Walmart
  Whirlpool Corporation
  Wynn Resorts
  Yahoo!

Universities
Canada
  University of Toronto

United Kingdom
   University of Cambridge
  Clare College, Cambridge
  Downing College, Cambridge
  Gonville and Caius College, Cambridge
  Jesus College, Cambridge
  Murray Edwards College, Cambridge
  Newnham College, Cambridge
  Pembroke College, Cambridge
  St Catharine's College, Cambridge
  St John's College, Cambridge
  Trinity College, Cambridge
  Trinity Hall, Cambridge
   University of Oxford
  All Souls College, Oxford
  Christ Church, Oxford
  Corpus Christi College, Oxford
  Exeter College, Oxford
  Lincoln College, Oxford
  Magdalen College, Oxford
  Merton College, Oxford
  Nuffield College, Oxford
  Somerville College, Oxford
  St Antony's College, Oxford
  St Catherine's College, Oxford
  The Queen's College, Oxford
  Trinity College, Oxford
  University College, Oxford
  Wolfson College, Oxford
  Worcester College, Oxford

United States
  Colgate University
  Columbia University
  Dartmouth College
  DePaul University
  Duke University
  Indiana University
  Johns Hopkins University
  Northeastern University
  Ohio State University
  Princeton University
  Purdue University
  Reed College
  Rutgers University
  Stanford University
  Syracuse University
  Texas Christian University
  Texas Tech University
  University of Alabama
  University of Pennsylvania
  University of Pittsburgh
  University of Southern California
  University of Texas System
  Washington State University
  Yale University

See also
 List of people named in the Panama Papers
 List of people named in the Pandora Papers

References

External links
The list on the website of International Consortium of Investigative Journalists (United States)

Paradise Papers
Paradise Papers
Paradise Papers